The 1966–67 Honduran Liga Nacional season was the 2nd edition of the Honduran Liga Nacional.  The format of the tournament remained the same as the previous season.  Club Deportivo Olimpia won the title and qualified to the 1967 CONCACAF Champions' Cup.

1966–67 teams

 C.D. Atlético Español (Tegucigalpa)
 C.D. España (San Pedro Sula)
 C.D. Honduras (El Progreso)
 C.D. Marathón (San Pedro Sula)
 C.D. Motagua (Tegucigalpa)
 C.D. Olimpia (Tegucigalpa)
 C.D. Platense (Puerto Cortés)
 C.D. San Pedro (San Pedro Sula)
 C.D. Troya (Tegucigalpa)
 C.D.S. Vida (La Ceiba)

Regular season

Standings

Top scorer
  Mauro Caballero (Marathón) with 12 goals

Squads

Trivia
 La Salle changed its name to San Pedro

References

Liga Nacional de Fútbol Profesional de Honduras seasons
1966–67 in Honduran football
Honduras